"Proud Mary" is a song by American rock band Creedence Clearwater Revival written by John Fogerty. It was released as a single in January1969 by Fantasy Records and on the band's second studio album, Bayou Country. The song became a major hit in the United States, peaking at No. 2 on the Billboard Hot 100 in March 1969, the first of five singles to peak at No. 2 for the group.

A cover version by Ike and Tina Turner, released two years later in 1971, did nearly as well, reaching No. 4 on the Billboard Hot 100 and winning a Grammy Award.

Background and recording
In a 1969 interview, Fogerty said that he wrote it in the two days after he was discharged from the National Guard.  In the liner notes for the 2008 expanded reissue of Bayou Country, Joel Selvin explained that the songs for the album started when Fogerty was in the National Guard, that the riffs for "Proud Mary", "Born on the Bayou", and "Keep on Chooglin'" were conceived by Fogerty at a concert in the Avalon Ballroom, and "Proud Mary" was arranged from parts of different songs, one of which was about a washerwoman named Mary.  The line "Left a good job in the city" was written following Fogerty's discharge from the National Guard, and the line "rollin' on the river" was from a movie by Will Rogers.

In the Macintosh application "GarageBand", Fogerty explained that he liked Beethoven's Fifth Symphony and wanted to open a song with a similar intro (descending by a third), implying the way "Proud Mary" opens with the repeated C chord to A chord. Fogerty wanted to evoke male gospel harmonies, as exemplified by groups he was familiar with such as the Swan Silvertones, the Sensational Nightingales, and the Five Blind Boys of Mississippi; especially on the line, "Rollin', rollin', rollin' on the river"; and in the guitar solo he did his "best [imitation of] Steve Cropper." The basic track for "Proud Mary", as with the other songs on the album, was recorded by John Fogerty (lead guitar), Tom Fogerty (rhythm guitar), Stu Cook (bass), and Doug Clifford (drums) at RCA Studios in Hollywood, California, with John overdubbing instruments and all the vocals later.

Billboard described "Proud Mary" as a "driving blues item with a strong beat."  Cash Box described it as "a steady moving mid-speed chunk of funk and rhythm that will make itself felt in both pop and underground spots."  Cash Box ranked it as the No. 55 single of 1969.

Charts

Weekly charts

Year-end charts

Certifications and sales

Solomon Burke version

In 1969 Solomon Burke had a small hit with his cover of the song, which was his second release for Bell and was co-produced by singer Tamiko Jones, who was being rehabilitated after a bout of polio, and was at the time Burke's fiancée and manager. Burke recalls: "We went to Muscle Shoals and recorded Proud Mary, which they didn't like at all. They thought it was stupid to record a song Proud Mary, which was already on the charts. I was explaining to them that it was a very big record, but it's a very white record, a pop record. We will redo the record, open up the doors for it to get on the r&b charts and make the black stations to play the record ... It was a Solomon Burke record made in Muscle Shoals. We proved that we can make a hit record without Jerry Wexler eating sandwiches with us. This record was a hit without anybody's help. Proud Mary was only promoted by Tamiko Jones and myself." According to Mark Denning, "While that may have seemed like a bald-faced bid for pop radio play, in Burke's hands the song became a bracing tale of life in the Deep South as African-Americans searched for liberation aboard the ship that carried them as slaves and put them to undignified labor serving wealthy whites."

John Fogerty, the song's composer, was impressed by Burke's version of his song: "Two thousand miles away this man had crawled right up inside my head to learn what Proud Mary was all about. Sure, it's great when someone sings your song, but when he understands it, you listen like it was the first time." "Reworked as a celebration of black consciousness, his potent mix of gospel and country – the kind that defined his earlier sides for Atlantic – and driven by a Southern funk-like strut, . ... it returned Burke to the US R&B Top 20", with the single reaching No. 15 on the R&B charts and No. 45 on the pop charts. According to Burke in a 2002 interview: "I was in Vegas for sixteen weeks at the Sands Hotel. I missed this record being a hit, because we weren't there to promote the record, we had no backing. The greatest thing I ever did was tell Ike Turner, "Hey man, you should get on this record ... I think you and Tina could tear this thing up." On 24 May 1969 Burke sang his version of "Proud Mary" on American Bandstand.

The Checkmates Ltd. Featuring Sonny Charles version

Checkmates, Ltd. released a cover of Proud Mary Featuring Sonny Charles in 1969. The song peaked at No. 69 on the US Billboard Hot 100 chart on the week of November 1, 1969.  It also reached No. 42 in France.

Ike & Tina Turner version

Ike & Tina Turner released "Proud Mary" In January 1971 as the second single from their 1970 album Workin' Together. Their rendition differs greatly from the structure of the original, but is also well-known and has become one of Tina Turner's most recognizable signature songs.

According to Tina, Ike was not keen on the original version, but the cover of "Proud Mary" by the Checkmates, Ltd. piqued his interest. Ike and Tina Turner's version was substantially rearranged by Ike Turner and Soko Richardson. The song starts off with a slow, sultry soulful tone in which Tina introduces the song and warns the audience that she and the band are gonna start it off "nice and easy" as "we never do nothing nice and easy" but say they would finish it "nice and rough". After the lyrics are first sung softly by the Turners, the song is then turned into a funk rock vamp with Tina and the Ikettes delivering gospel-influenced vocals.

The single peaked at No. 4 on the Billboard Hot 100 chart on March 27, 1971, two years after the original by Creedence Clearwater Revival was at its peak. It also reached No. 5 on the Billboard R&B chart, and earned the duo a Grammy Award for Best R&B Vocal Performance by a Group in 1972.

Ike and Tina first performed a version of the song on Playboy After Dark on December 3, 1969; episode aired on February 3, 1970. They also performed it on The Ed Sullivan Show on January 11, 1970, in the film It's Your Thing (1970), and on Soul Train on April 22, 1972. The song became a staple in all of their live shows. Live versions of the song were released on the albums Live at Carnegie Hall (1971) and Live In Paris (1971).

The song continued to be an essential part of Tina Turner's performances. In 1988, a live version was included on the album Tina Live in Europe. In the biopic What's Love Got to Do with It, the song is performed in a timeline of events in Ike and Tina Turner's career in which the couple are transformed from an opening act for the Rolling Stones to a major headlining act in the 1970s. Tina re-recorded the song for the biopic's 1993 soundtrack album of the same name. This track was released as a promotional single issued to radio stations and DJs. Tina Turner's solo performance was later included on her 2004 greatest hits album All the Best. After a contestant's take on the song on The X Factor in 2010, it entered the UK Singles Chart at No. 62 and fell to No. 121 the next week; it also entered the Scottish Singles Chart at No. 40. Another live version was released in 2009 on the Tina Live album. It was recorded on March 21, 2009, in Arnhem, Netherlands as part of Turner's 50th Anniversary Tour. Tina also performed duets of "Proud Mary" with Beyoncé and Cher.

Critical reception 
Billboard (January 23, 1971): "The John Fogerty classic gets a powerhouse treatment with the Turner originality and drive to put it back up the Hot 100 and soul charts. Dynamite entry."

Cash Box (January 23, 1971): "Slow intro almost belies the power that grows into this revival of the Creedence monument. R&B sales could build enough momentum to put the side into top forty again."

Record World (January 23, 1971): "Ike & Tina play it 'nice and rough' on Creedence Clearwater's contemporary classic. Great to hear Ike join in with his fine bass and Tina's far out intro is worth the price of admission alone."

Formats and track listings
1971 US 7-inch

 Proud Mary – 3:15
Funkier Than A Mosquito's Tweeter – 2:40

1993 US 7-inch and cassette single

"Proud Mary (Edit Live Version) – 4:32
"The Best" (Live) – 5:22

1993 US CD single

"Proud Mary (Edit Live Version) – 4:32
"Proud Mary (Edit) – 4:10
"We Don't Need Another Hero (Thunderdome)" (Live) – 4:55
"The Best" (Live) – 5:22

Chart performance

Weekly charts

Ike and Tina Turner

Year-end charts

Tina Turner solo version

Certifications and sales

Accolades
For their rendition, Ike & Tina Turner won a Grammy Award for Best R&B Vocal Performance by a Group in 1972. Both CCR and Ike & Tina Turner's versions of the song received Grammy Hall of Fame Awards, in 1998 and 2003, respectively. "Proud Mary" ranked at No. 155 on Rolling Stones 2004 list of The 500 Greatest Songs of All Time.

Other versions
"Proud Mary" has, over the years, been recorded by a number of artists. Anthony Armstrong Jones' 1969 version reached number 22 on the U.S. country charts. Also in 1969, a version recorded by the Checkmates, Ltd. and produced by Phil Spector reached number 30 on the U.K. Singles Chart and number 69 on the Billboard Hot 100. In 1970, the song was recorded by Leonard Nimoy, in his album The New World of Leonard Nimoy.

Elvis Presley began incorporating "Proud Mary" into his live shows in 1970. Presley's version is a full-out rocker and is featured in his 1972 concert film Elvis on Tour, and on his live albums On Stage (1970) and As Recorded at Madison Square Garden (1972).

Amanda Ayala performed a rendition of "Proud Mary" in 2019 on Topgolf TV's "Who Will Rock You?" The performance was subsequently released exclusively on Spotify.

Prince performed a sample of "Proud Mary" during his 2007 Super Bowl Halftime Show performance.

References

External links
 
 

1968 songs
1969 singles
1971 singles
1993 singles
Songs written by John Fogerty
Creedence Clearwater Revival songs
Ike & Tina Turner songs
Tina Turner songs
Number-one singles in South Africa
Checkmates, Ltd. songs
Solomon Burke songs
Anthony Armstrong Jones songs
Song recordings produced by John Fogerty
Fantasy Records singles
Parlophone singles
A&M Records singles
Liberty Records singles
Bell Records singles
Songs about Memphis, Tennessee
Songs about rivers
Song recordings produced by Ike Turner
Swamp rock songs
Grammy Hall of Fame Award recipients
Male–female vocal duets